Pinguicula rotundiflora is a species of carnivorous plant in the butterwort genus Pinguicula, family Lentibulariaceae, native to northeastern Mexico. It has gained the Royal Horticultural Society's Award of Garden Merit.

References

rotundiflora
Carnivorous plants of North America
Endemic flora of Mexico
Flora of Northeastern Mexico
Plants described in 1985